Cardoness Castle is a well-preserved 15th-century tower house just south west of Gatehouse of Fleet, in the historical county of Kirkcudbrightshire in Scotland. It was originally owned by the MacCullochs of Myreton. They abandoned the castle in the late 17th century, following the execution of Sir Godfrey McCulloch for the murder of a Clan Gordon neighbour. It is now in the care of Historic Environment Scotland, and is a scheduled monument.

History
Around 1170 the lands of Anwoth were granted by Malcolm IV to David fitz Teri, a Cumbrian lord, who built a motte-and-bailey castle at Boreland, close to the present castle. In 1220 a Nicholas de Kerdenes and his wife Cicely were in dispute with the monastery at Dundrennan over Cicely's dowry—he eventually appealed to the Pope. In 1277, Bertram de Kerdennes was a witness to a charter by King Alexander III (reigned 1249–1286), confirming a grant by Devorguilla de Balliol to Glasgow Cathedral. On 18 June 1342 Malcolm Fleming, Earl of Wigtown, was granted a charter of the lands of Cardoness, in Galloway, from King David II in excambion (exchange) for the lands of Mochrum which the King had formerly given him. He was also granted other lands in Wigtownshire.

The lands of Cardoness were in the McCulloch family by 1466. Writing in 1864, Sir Andrew Agnew recorded a local tradition relating how the McCullochs came to possess Cardoness:

The McCulloch lairds built the present Cardoness Castle in the late 15th century. In the 1560s, an English spy reported on the castle to Elizabeth I of England, in preparation for a planned invasion of Scotland that never took place. In 1622 the Gordons of Ardwall acquired the mortgaged estate. Feuding between the McCullochs and the Gordons culminated in 1690 when Sir Godfrey McCulloch shot dead William Gordon of Buck o'Bield. Sir Godfrey escaped to France, but was spotted in Edinburgh in 1697 and beheaded on the Maiden, the Scottish equivalent of the guillotine. It was subsequently uninhabited, and passed through the hands of a number of owners before being placed in state care in 1927. It has been protected as a scheduled monument since 1928, and is now maintained by Historic Environment Scotland. The castle is open to the public.

References

External links

Cardoness Castle – site information from Historic Environment Scotland

Castles in Kirkcudbrightshire
Castles in Dumfries and Galloway
Scheduled Ancient Monuments in Dumfries and Galloway
Historic Scotland properties in Dumfries and Galloway
Tower houses in Scotland
Gatehouse of Fleet